Dato' Paul Leong Khee Seong (born 1939) was a Malaysian politician from the Malaysian People's Movement Party (GERAKAN) who served as four-term Member of Parliament (MP) of Malaysia for Taiping between 1974 and 1990. He was also Minister of Primary Industries of Malaysia between 1978 and 1986. He is currently the Chancellor of HELP University.

Background
Leong was born in Ipoh, Perak to a family involved in tin mining and plantation with ancestral roots in Guangdong, China. Before entering politics, he was working in his father's business.

Political career
Leong entered the Malaysian politics scene after the 13 May incident. Prior to joining GERAKAN, he was a member of the Malaysian Chinese Association (MCA) and last served as its Perak Chairman in 1972. Over the next two decades, he served in various posts within GERAKAN which saw him eventually occupy the office of Deputy chairman.

Having been elected into Parliament between 1974 and 1990, Leong was appointed as Deputy Minister of Primary Industries in 1974 before being promoted to Minister of Primary Industries four years later.

During his tenure as Malaysia's Minister of Primary Industries, he also held several international posts. These included Chairman of the General Agreement on Tariffs and Trade (GATT) Negotiating Committee in Tropical Products from 1986 to 1987 and Chairman of the Group of Fourteen on Association of Southeast Asian Nations (ASEAN) Economic Co-operation and Integration in 1986.

Education
Leong graduated from the University of New South Wales with a Bachelor of Chemical Engineering in 1963.

Personal life
Following his retirement from politics, Leong has been active in the corporate sector. Among the many offices he has held includes serving as the Executive Chairman of Nanyang Press Holdings Berhad (2007–2009) and Deputy Chairman of Sin Chew Media Corporation (2004–2007), Independent non-executive director of AirAsia (2004–2013) and TSH Resources Limited (2005–2014).

Since 2010, he has been an Independent non-executive director of the Industrial and Commercial Bank of China Limited (Malaysia). In 2012, he was appointed as the first Chancellor of HELP University following the university's accordance of university status.

Election results

Honours
  :
  Knight of the Order of Cura Si Manja Kini (DPCM) – Dato' (1979)

References

 

1939 births
People from Perak
Malaysian people of Hakka descent
Malaysian politicians of Chinese descent
Living people
University of New South Wales alumni
Parti Gerakan Rakyat Malaysia politicians
20th-century Malaysian politicians
Former Malaysian Chinese Association politicians
21st-century Malaysian people
Members of the Dewan Rakyat
Government ministers of Malaysia